Mark Sifneos (born 24 November 1996) is a Dutch professional footballer who plays as a striker for Cypriot Second Division club Ayia Napa. Besides the Cyprus, he has played in India, Greece and Netherlands.

Club career
He made his professional debut in the Eerste Divisie for RKC Waalwijk on 1 February 2016 in a game against Jong PSV. In August 2017, he signed for Kerala Blasters. He is the youngest foreigner to be signed by a team in the Indian Super League. He left Kerala Blasters with mutual consent on 23 January 2018.

On 26 January, he joined FC Goa till the end of the season.

On 4 August 2018, Sifneos signed a three-year contract with Greek club Panathinaikos, for an undisclosed fee. On 15 July 2019, Panathinaikos informed about the loan of Sifneos to Apollon Larissa F.C. He had been the first addition to the squad last year, but he succeeded to play only 11 minutes against O. F. Ierapetra for the Greek Cup. In the 2019–20 season, he made progress in the Super League 2 with Apollon Larissa, registering seven goals in 19 matches.

On 21 July 2020, he signed with Chiasso on a free transfer.

References

External links
 
 

Living people
1996 births
Association football forwards
Footballers from Amsterdam
Dutch people of Greek descent
Dutch footballers
Dutch expatriate footballers
RKC Waalwijk players
Kerala Blasters FC players
FC Goa players
Panathinaikos F.C. players
Apollon Larissa F.C. players
FC Chiasso players
Eerste Divisie players
Super League Greece 2 players
Indian Super League players
Expatriate footballers in India
Expatriate footballers in Switzerland